Mercy Ruggles Bisbee Jackson, M.D. (17 September 180213 December 1877) was an American physician. She was one of the first women to receive a Doctor of Medicine degree, specifically in obstetrics and gynecology.

Domestic life 
Mercy Ruggles was born in Hardwick, Massachusetts on September 17, 1802, to Constant Ruggles, Esq. and his wife. This was a point in history where women were still held back in many ways, including education and the job field; they were simply not given the same opportunities for advancement that males were. Many women were given no other options than to stay at home with their children and spend their days in a much more private sphere of life. For women who were interested in the healthcare field and able to get jobs, they would typically work as nurses, midwives, or 'healers'. Jackson was able to attend school, and at the age of 17 she graduated from a private school in Hardwick. Jackson was already paving the way for many young women to follow in her footsteps. At the age of 17 Jackson was already striving to break into the heavily male-dominated medical field. Shortly after her graduation, Jackson moved to Plainfield to take up a temporary teaching job. At the end of this, she moved closer to home again, soon after meeting her first husband John Bisbee whom she married in 1823. Jackson and Bisbee had three children together, one of whom died in infancy from Scarlet fever, and another dying of Pneumonia in 1832. Jackson was left a widow in 1829 when Bisbee died unexpectedly from pneumonia. This left Jackson alone and with an opportunity to open a school for young ladies, giving them a very basic education. Very shortly after, Jackson met her second husband Capt. Daniel Jackson who had four children from a previous marriage. Jackson cared for these children as her own. Together, they moved to Plymouth in the year 1833, right after they were married. Over the course of their time together, Mercy and Daniel had eight children together, only four of whom survived. All together Mercy bore eleven children, and mothered fifteen. This was part of what fueled her interest gynecology, and medical research as a whole. While in Plymouth, Massachusetts, Mercy practiced medicine as well as she could with no formal education background; working all 18 years while she lived there. But sadly, after 19 years of marriage, her second husband died of cancer in 1852. At this point Mercy started to get even more serious than before with her studies; she felt that in order to further her success she must receive a much more formal education and training. Jackson returned to school in her 50s to study homeopathy.

Education 
She graduated from a private school at age 17. At the age of 58, Jackson earned the Doctor of Medicine degree at Boston's New England Female Medical College (1860) now known as Boston University School of Medicine.

Career in homeopathy 
Mercy B. Jackson was heavily involved in American Homeopathy in the 19th century, even attending a few conventions as a speaker and presenter. Jackson specialized in Obstetrics and Gynaecology with a heavy focus on uterine hemorrhaging. Problems such as 'displacement of the uterus' were common in this time, and it was thought to affect a woman's ability to bear children, and even her overall health and wellbeing. The suggested treatments for this were no better than the actual problem, as most of them such as scarification, electricity, cauterization, and abdominal supporters were very dangerous to a women's health. As for uterine hemorrhaging, the most common treatment was simply putting ice on it and hoping that the bleeding would stop. Jackson was one of many homeopaths that took an interest in changing this practice in order to make it more comfortable for the patient and less damaging. By word of mouth, Jackson became known to many women across the country. She was preferred by many because she was a woman due to the fact that it was frowned upon for a female to have a male gynecologist. She was known to give women the right medication that they so badly needed; she was not known to have patients with persistent symptoms even after treatment. After becoming very well known very quickly, Mercy became the first woman to be inducted into the American Institute of Homeopathy. Mercy had a very fulfilling career, as homeopathy very quickly gained popularity as Jackson was attending school and just beginning her practices. Throughout Jackson's life she was mentioned in many homeopathic journals in both the United States and Britain.

Mercy Ruggles Bisbee Jackson died December 13, 1877, in Boston, Massachusetts and is buried at Oak Grove Cemetery in Plymouth, Massachusetts.

Citations 
Hanaford, Phebe A. Daughters of America; Or, Women of the Century. Augusta, Me.: True, 1882. Print.
Port, Jane. "Mercy B. Jackson, M.D." Pilgrim Hall Museum. Web. <http://www.pilgrimhallmuseum.org/pdf/Mercy_B_Jackson.pdf >.
Kirschmann, Anne Taylor. Vital Force: Women in American Homeopathy. New Brunswick, NJ, USA: Rutgers University Press, 2003. ProQuest ebrary. Web. 22 February 2016.
Jeançon, J. A. Diseases of the Sexual Organs: Anatomy, Normal and Morbid ; Pathology, Physical Diagnosis and Treatment of the Diseases of Those Organs. Cincinnati: Progress Pub., 1887. Print.

References

Further reading

1802 births
1877 deaths
19th-century women scientists
Boston University School of Medicine alumni
Physicians from Massachusetts
American homeopaths
19th-century American women physicians
19th-century American physicians